Macanese cuisine is mainly influenced by Chinese cuisine, especially Cantonese cuisine and European cuisine, especially Portuguese cuisine and influences from Southeast Asia and the Lusophone world, due to Macau's past as a Portuguese colony and long history of being an international tourist gambling centre.

Minchi, egg tarts, pork chop buns, ginger milk and almond cakes are some of the region's most common delicacies. Common cooking methods make use of various spices such as turmeric, coconut milk, and cinnamon to give dishes an extra kick of aroma and enhancement of taste. Many routinely consumed dishes in Macau belong to a subclass (Heungshan) of Cantonese cuisine. Many Macanese dishes resulted from the spice blends that the wives of Portuguese sailors used in an attempt to replicate European dishes with local Chinese ingredients and seasonings.

Typically, Macanese food is seasoned with various spices including turmeric, coconut milk, and cinnamon, and dried cod (bacalhau), giving special aromas and tastes. Popular dishes include galinha à Portuguesa, galinha à Africana (African chicken), bacalhau (traditional Portuguese salt cod), pato de cabidela, Macanese chili shrimps, minchi, stir-fried curry crab; pig's ear and papaya salad, and rabbit stewed in wine, cinnamon and star anise.

Cha Gordo (literally "Fat Tea") is a culinary tradition amongst the Macanese community in Macau that is likened to afternoon tea. Historically, families with Portuguese heritage in Macau would host a Cha Gordo for a number of occasions, including Catholic holidays, christening, or birthdays, but they can be held for any reason. Historically, some families would even host one on a weekly basis. A Cha Gordo would take place following a Macanese wedding, instead of the elaborate banquet seen in Chinese weddings.

Macanese dishes and desserts

Non-Macanese Macau snacks

See also
 Cantonese cuisine
 History of Macau
 Hong Kong cuisine
 List of Chinese dishes

Select bibliography

 Ferreira Lamas, João António (1995). A culinária dos macaenses.  Oporto: Lello & Irmão.
 Gomes, Maria Margarida (1984). A cozinha macaense. Macau: Imprensa Nacional.
 Senna, Maria Celestina de Mello e (1998). Cozinha de Macau. Lisbon: Vega

References

External links
 A Guide to Macanese Food: What happens when China, Portugal, and Las Vegas come together.
 Some Macau dishes, incarnating Portuguese influences

 
Cantonese cuisine